Nigorella is a genus of jumping spiders that was first described by Wanda Wesołowska & Beata Tomasiewicz in 2008. The name is described as "an arbitrary combination of letters", feminine in gender. Three previously species described were transferred to the genus: Pachypoessa albimana as N. albimana, Philaeus manicus as N. manica, and Euophrys plebeja as N. plebeja. Subsequently it was discovered that Euophrys plebeja was a nomen dubium, with no known type specimen.

Description
The first pair of legs is the longest. They are dark in color, with no distinct patterning.

Members of this genus can be distinguished from others by the structure of the copulatory organs. The male pedipalp has a single short apophysis on its tibia. The palpal bulb has a rounded tegulum and a short embolus with an additional terminal apophysis.

The female epigyne is wider than long with two lateral copulatory openings. The inlet to the seminal ducts is hidden in deep cavities.

Species
 it contains eight species, found in Asia and Africa:
Nigorella aethiopica Wesolowska & Tomasiewicz, 2008 (type) – Ethiopia
Nigorella albimana (Simon, 1902) – West and Central Africa
Nigorella hirsuta Wesolowska, 2009 – Zimbabwe, South Africa
Nigorella hirticeps (Song & Chai, 1992) – China
Nigorella hunanensis (Peng, Xie & Kim, 1993) – China
Nigorella manica (Peckham & Peckham, 1903) – Zimbabwe
Nigorella petrae (Prószyński, 1992) – Thailand
Nigorella sichuanensis (Peng, Xie & Kim, 1993) – China

References

Salticidae genera
Salticidae
Spiders of Africa
Taxa named by Wanda Wesołowska